Evamarie Hey-Hawkins is a German inorganic chemist and professor at Leipzig University. Her research is focused on main group and transition metal chemistry.

Biography
She received her diploma (1982) and doctoral degree (1983) at the University of Marburg, Germany, with Kurt Dehnicke. After stays at the University of Sussex, UK (1984/85), the University of Western Australia (1985/86) and the ANU (1986/87), she returned to Germany and completed her habilitation in Marburg (1988). From 1988 to 1990 she was a research associate at the Max Planck Institute for Solid State Research, Stuttgart. Evamarie Hey-Hawkins has been a Full Professor of Inorganic Chemistry at Leipzig University, Germany, since 1993.

Research
Her scientific interests comprise many aspects of structural and synthetic chemistry.  Much of her work focuses on main group compounds, especially phosphorus compounds. She has also conducted research on bioactive boron compounds. She has authored more than 540 publications in refereed journals.

References

External links 
 Website of The Hey-Hawkins Research Group at Leipzig University 
 Boron-Based Compounds: Potential and Emerging Applications in Medicine, ed. E. Hey-Hawkins and C. Viñas Teixidor, Wiley, 2018. 
 Smart Inorganic Polymers: Synthesis, Properties and Emerging Applications in Materials and Life Sciences, ed. E. Hey-Hawkins, M. Hissler, Wiley, 2019. (wiley.com)

20th-century German chemists
Inorganic chemists
Living people
German women chemists
Year of birth missing (living people)
Recipients of the Order of Merit of the Free State of Saxony
21st-century German chemists